The 495th Fighter Group is an active duty fighter group in the United States Air Force. It is assigned to Fifteenth Air Force of Air Combat Command and stationed at Shaw Air Force Base, South Carolina, with additional units at multiple active Air Force, Air Force Reserve Command and Air National Guard installations across the United States.

The group was first activated in England during World War II as the 495th Fighter Training Group and trained fighter aircraft pilots for Eighth Air Force until it was disbanded in 1945.  It was activated again in 2013 as the headquarters for Air Combat Command "active associate" fighter units.

World War II

The 495th Fighter Training Group was established on 9 October 1943 and activated 26 October 1943 at RAF Atcham, England to provide forward training on tactics and operations for the European Theater during World War II.  The group exercised command over the 551st and 552nd Fighter Training Squadrons flying the P-47 Thunderbolt and P-38 Lightning preparing pilots for action with Eighth and Ninth Air Forces.  It moved to RAF Cheddington, in February 1945, and at the conclusion of hostilities was disbanded 15 April 1945.

Active associate unit
"In 2008, Air Force leadership recognized that the changing force structure demanded creative ways to generate experienced fighter pilots. The solution was to capitalize on the experience and assets of the Guard and Reserve. This Total Force Integration initiative became Active Association, whereby Regular Air Force personnel work side-by-side with host Air Reserve and Air National Guard Component units in a mutually beneficial relationship."

"The 495th Fighter Group was reactivated 8 March 2013, at Shaw Air Force Base, SC, as an active association between active-duty pilots and their guard and reserve counterparts and marked a historical moment in the Air Force's ongoing initiative to integrate active-duty Airmen, Air Force Reserve Command (AFRC) and Air National Guard (ANG) units to streamline training, spending and resource use.  As a direct reporting unit to 9th Air Force, the 495FG is made up of more than 600 active-duty personnel across 22 ARC and ANG Fighter Wings under Air Combat Command."

"Total Force Integration is a vital enterprise aimed at maximizing the combined contributions of the Active and Reserve components, while ensuring "right-sizing" of component mix. The 495th Fighter Group will continue to lead active associate units into the future of Air Force pilot training and the partnerships will allow active-duty, Air National Guard and Air Reserve Component fighter units to share resources, reduce duplications of effort, and ultimately, increase the Air Force's overall air defense capabilities in order to enhance the ability to provide dominant combat airpower for America."

Lineage
 Established as the 495th Fighter Training Group on 9 October 1943
 Activated 26 October 1943
 Disbanded on 15 April 1945
 Reconstituted and redesignated 495th Fighter Group
 Activated on 8 March 2013

Assignments
 VIII Air Force Composite Command, 26 October 1943
 VIII Fighter Command, December 1943
 VIII Air Force Composite Command, February 1944
 VIII Fighter Command, September 1944
 1st Bombardment Division (later 1st Air Division), November 1944 – 15 April 1945
 Ninth Air Force, 8 March 2013 – 20 August 2020
 Fifteenth Air Force, 20 August 2020 – present

Components
 24th Fighter Squadron, 25 October 2019 – present
 Naval Air Station Fort Worth Joint Reserve Base, Texas
 53d Fighter Squadron, 10 December 2021 – present
 Joint Base Andrews, Maryland
 315th Fighter Squadron, 10 January 2016 – present
 Burlington Air National Guard Base, Vermont
 316th Fighter Squadron, 2 October 2015 – present
 McEntire Joint National Guard Base, South Carolina
 355th Fighter Squadron, 5 October 2015 – 25 Oct 2019
 Naval Air Station Fort Worth Joint Reserve Base, Texas
 358th Fighter Squadron, 23 October 2015 – present
 Whiteman Air Force Base, Missouri
 367th Fighter Squadron, c. 23 October 2015 – present
 Homestead Air Reserve Base, Florida
 377th Fighter Squadron, c. 7 November 2015 – present
 Montgomery Air National Guard Base, Alabama
 378th Fighter Squadron, 8 November 2015 – present
 Truax Field Air National Guard Base, Wisconsin
 383d Fighter Squadron, 1 February 2016 - present
 Buckley Space Force Base, Colorado 
 551st Fighter Training Squadron, 26 October 1943 – 15 April 1945
 552d Fighter Training Squadron, 26 October 1943 – 15 April 1945

Stations

 RAF Atcham, England, 25 December 1943
 RAF Cheddington, England, 15 February 1945 – 15 April 1945
 Shaw Air Force Base, South Carolina, 8 March 2013–present

Aircraft flown
 F-16 Fighting Falcon, 2013–present
 A-10 Thunderbolt II, 2013–present

References

 Notes

Bibliography

 

Fighter groups of the United States Air Force
Fighter groups of the United States Army Air Forces
Military units and formations established in 1943